Balou is a rural settlement in the Cavaellon commune of the Aquin Arrondissement, in the Sud department of Haiti.

References

Populated places in Sud (department)